"Sobrenadar" is Paula Garcia's solo project.

Paula Garcia is an Argentinean singer and songwriter. 
Born on 29 February 1988 Resistencia, Chaco (in northern Argentina).

In 2006, she moved to Buenos Aires and began to study music production at the Escuela de Musica de Buenos Aires. Two years later Paula moved back home and starting recording songs in her bedroom studio which have been self-described like ‘watery music’. She blends together reverby beats, electronic elements, soft guitars, and voice whispering to create "aquatic" Dream Pop tunes that give the impression of listening underwater.
"Sobrenadar" can be translated to "over-swimming" (to float).

The track "Sommeil Paradoxal" has been included in a compilation "Así suena el verano", released through the publication Indie Hoy (Argentina).  
Also the song "Esmerilado" in Weekly Magic Tape #27 of Magic (magazine) (France).

Discography

Albums
Sobrenadar (November 2010)
1859      (March 2012)
Tres      (March 2014)

EPs
"Vent Solaire" (July 2011)
"Guam" (cassette, 15") (Magic Rub, USA label) (October 2011)
"Alucinari" (cassette, 15") (Magic Rub, USA label) (July 2013)

External links

 Sobrenadar on Bandcamp.com
 Sobrenadar on Soundcloud.com
 Sobrenadar on MySpace.com
 Escucharemos
 Retrobeta
 Paperblog France
 Esmerilado track on Weekly Magic Tape #27
 Sommeil Paradoxal on Indie Hoy
 Bien Copet Campo Estelar Video Announcement
 Absent Fever Label EP Release Announcement

1988 births
Living people
21st-century Argentine women singers
Argentine women singer-songwriters
Singers from Buenos Aires